McGee Park is a public park located in Farmington, New Mexico.  It is owned by San Juan County and consists of the following facilities:

Memorial Coliseum
The McGee Park Memorial Coliseum, a 5,137-seat multipurpose arena, is one of only five indoor arenas in New Mexico. It has a  arena floor and can seat up to 8,137 for concerts. Rodeos, Ice shows, other sporting events, along with conventions and trade shows, are also held here. The arena has only two concession stands, and contains a covered  pavilion as well as a  patio area where the arena's ticket facilities are located.

Convention Center
The McGee Park Convention Center, built in 2006, features  of space and can seat up to 5,757.  It is used for concerts, conventions, trade shows, banquets, and other special events.  There is a 40-by-60-foot permanent stage, two dressing rooms, and a concession area, among other amenities at the center.

Multi-Use Building
The  Multi-Use Building is used for banquets, meetings and other special events.  It consists of five meeting rooms.

Riding Arena
The riding arena is a 1,250-seat indoor arena, built in 2006.  It is used for rodeos and other equestrian events.  It contains  of space.

Outdoor Arena
The Outdoor Arena has  of space and also seats 1,250.  It also is used for auto racing and equestrian events.

Other facilities
Other facilities at McGee Park include:
A livestock barn.
100 horse stalls.
A  patio.
A  covered pavilion
574 RV lots.

External links
Official page

Convention centers in New Mexico
Sports venues in New Mexico
Farmington, New Mexico
Parks in San Juan County, New Mexico
Buildings and structures in San Juan County, New Mexico
Music venues in New Mexico
Rodeo venues in the United States